The city of Ottawa, Canada held municipal elections on December 7, 1964.

Controller Don Reid is elected as mayor, defeating incumbent mayor Charlotte Whitton, who placed third behind broadcaster Frank Ryan.

Mayor of Ottawa

Referendums

Ottawa Board of Control
(4 elected)

City council

(2 elected from each ward)

References
Ottawa Journal, December 8, 1964

Municipal elections in Ottawa
1964 elections in Canada
1960s in Ottawa
1964 in Ontario
December 1964 events in North America